Napoleon High School is a public high school located in Napoleon, North Dakota. It currently serves about 119 students. The athletic teams are known as the Imperials, and the school colors are royal blue and gold. It is known for its fantastic wrestling teams and exceptional volleyball teams.

Athletics

Championships
North Dakota 9-man high school football: 1975, 2006, 2011
North Dakota Class B high school wrestling: 1975, 1980, 1981, 1982, 1989, 1990, 1997, 2002, 2003, 2004, 2005, 2006, 2007
North Dakota Class B boys' track champions: 1979

References

External links
Napoleon High School

Public high schools in North Dakota
North Dakota High School Activities Association (Class B)
Schools in Logan County, North Dakota